Singleton is a surname. People with the surname include:

 Al Singleton (born 1975), American football linebacker
 Alvin Singleton (born 1940), American composer
 Antron Singleton, known as Big Lurch (born 1976), American rapper and cannibal
 Benjamin "Pap" Singleton (1809–1892), African American separatist leader
 Billy Singleton (born 1968), British basketball player
 C. T. Singleton, Jr., (1905–1977), American admiral
 Charles Laverne Singleton (1959–2004), executed inmate
 Charles Singleton (songwriter) (1913–1985), American songwriter
 Charles S. Singleton (1909–1985), American critic of literature
 Chris Singleton (musician) (born 1977), Irish musician
 Chris Singleton (American football) (born 1967), American football player
 Chris Singleton (baseball) (born 1972), American baseball player
 Frederick W. Singleton (1858–1941), New York assemblyman
 George Singleton, (born 1958), American writer
 Gordon Singleton (born 1956), Canadian Olympic cyclist
 Harry Singleton (1877–1948), English footballer
 Henry Earl Singleton (1916–1999), co-founder of Teledyne
 IronE Singleton (born 1975), American actor
 James Singleton (basketball) (born 1981), American professional basketball player
 Jim Singleton (born 1931), New Orleans politician
 John Singleton (1968–2019), American film director, producer, and screenwriter
 John Singleton (Australian entrepreneur) (born 1942) Australian entrepreneur
 Jon Singleton (born 1991) American baseball player
 Ken Singleton (born 1947), American baseball player and sportscaster
 Kenneth Singleton (born 1951), American economist
 Lawrence Singleton (1927–2001), American criminal
 Mark Singleton (actor) (1919–1986), British actor
 Mark Singleton (politician) (1762–1840), Anglo-Irish politician
 Michael Singleton (1913–2002), English cricketer
 Mike Singleton (born 1951), British programmer
 Penny Singleton (1908–2003), American actress 
 Robert Singleton (disambiguation), several people, including
 Robert Singleton (priest) (died 1544), English Roman Catholic priest
 Robert Singleton (activist) (born 1936), Freedom Rider during 1961
 Robert Corbet Singleton (1810–1881), Irish academic and hymnwriter
 Robert S. Singleton (born 1933), American engineer and inventor
 Roger Singleton-Turner, British television director
 Sandy Singleton (1914–1999), English cricketer 
 Theresa A. Singleton (born 1952), American archaeologist and writer
 Thomas Singleton (disambiguation), several people, including
 Thomas Singleton (academic) (1552–1614), Vice-Chancellor of the University of Oxford
 Thomas Singleton (priest) (1783–1842), Archdeacon of Northumberland
 Thomas D. Singleton (died 1833), US Representative from South Carolina
 Tommy Singleton (1940–2005), English footballer
 Valerie Singleton (born 1937), British television and radio presenter
 Walter K. Singleton (1944–1967), Medal of Honor recipient
 William Singleton (politician) (died 1677), English politician in the English Civil War
 William Dean Singleton (born 1951), founder and CEO of MediaNews Group
 Zutty Singleton (1898–1975), American jazz drummer

English-language surnames